Events from the 10th century in Ireland.

900s
900
 Death of Tadg mac Conchobair, King of Connacht
 Death of Litan, abbot of Tuam

902
 Dublin has been abandoned - the end of the Longphort phase - the term used by modern scholars to refer to the earliest period of Viking settlement at Dublin

904
 Mughroin mac Sochlachan, 30th King of Uí Maine, died.

908
 13 September - Flann Sinna slew Cormac mac Cuilennáin, the king-bishop of Cashel and King of Munster, at the battle of Belach Mughna, in Leinster.

909
 Death of Sochlachan mac Diarmata, 31st King of Uí Maine.
 Death of Cerball mac Muirecáin, King of Leinster

910s
911
Drogheda is established as a Viking settlement on the River Boyne.

911 or 914
A large Viking fleet arrives in Waterford and a second period of Viking raids begins. The Vikings also established a base in Waterford.

916
 25 May: death of Flann Sinna (b 847 or 848), the son of Máel Sechnaill mac Máele Ruanaid of Clann Cholmáin, a branch of the southern Uí Néill. He was King of Mide from 877 onwards, following Donnchad mac Eochocain, and is counted as a High King of Ireland
 Death of Mór ingen Cearbhaill, Queen of Laigin.
917
 The Annals of Ulster records the arrival of two Viking fleets in Ireland in 917, one led by Ragnall and the other by Sigtrygg, both of the Uí Ímair kindred. They fought a battle against Niall Glundub in which the Irish were routed, and according to the annals Sigtrygg then "entered Áth Cliath", i.e. Dublin, which we must assume means that he took possession of it. Ragnall Uí Ímair went on to Scotland, and then conquered York and became king there.

919
Niall Glúndub, overking of the Uí Néill, killed in the battle of Dublin. He fell fighting the Dublin Norse at Islandbridge.

920s
922
The Vikings establish a Longphort in Limerick.
Death of Muiredach Mac Domhnaill, abbot of Monasterboice, under whose auspices the great high cross was made.

925
Death of Tadg mac Cathail, King of Connacht.

926 or 941
Brian Boru (d.1014), future High King of Ireland is thought to have been born in 926 or in 941.

927
Death of Sigtrygg Caech (or Sihtric), a Norse-Gael King of Dublin who later reigned as king of York. His epithet means the 'Squinty'. He belonged to the Uí Ímair kindred.

928
Viking massacre of native Irish in Dunmore Caves in County Kilkenny.

930s
936
 Death of Sochlachan mac Diarmata, 32nd King of Uí Maine.

940s
944
Death of Donnchad Donn mac Flainn, King of Mide; he is succeeded by Oengus mac Donnchada.

950s
956
Death of Congalach Cnogba, High King of Ireland, of the Síl nÁedo Sláine, part of the Southern Uí Néill. Domnall ua Néill becomes overking of the Uí Néill and reigns until his death in 980.

960s
960
 Gormflaith was born in Naas, County Kildare. She was the daughter of Murchad mac Find, King of Leinster. She was also the mother of King Sigtrygg Silkbeard of Dublin.
Death of Murchadh mac Aodha, 33rd King of Uí Maine.

964
Mathgamain mac Cennetig, leader of the Dál gCais from east Clare, captures Cashel from the Eóganachta.

968
Battle of Sulcoit where Brian Boru and Mathgamain defeat Ivar of Limerick.

970s
970
A hoard of 43 silver and bronze items was left in a rocky cleft deep in Dunmore Caves near Kilkenny. It consisted of silver, ingots and conical buttons woven from fine silver and was discovered in 1999.

976
Mathgamain, leader of the Dál gCais from east Clare, is killed.
Death of Muirchertach mac Mael Sechnaill, King of Mide.
977
Brian Bóruma has Ivar of Limerick killed.
977/8 
Brian Bóruma defeats the last independent Norse of Limerick in the Battle of Cathair Cuan.
978
Brian Bóruma defeats Máel Muad mac Brain in the Battle of Belach Lechta and becomes King of Munster; death of Máel Muad mac Brain.

980s
980
Death of Domnall ua Néill, overking of the Uí Néill, who had reigned since 956: he is succeeded by Mael Seachnaill II, who reigned until his death in 1022
Battle of Tara, at which Mael Seachnaill II defeats a Viking army from Dublin.

981
Mael Seachnaill II besieges and takes the city of Dublin from the Vikings and imposes a heavy tribute on them.

982
The King of Munster, Brian Boru starts extending his authority from his base around Limerick up the River Shannon. By doing so, he comes into conflict with High King Mael Seachnaill II whose power base is the Province of Meath. It is that start of a conflict that lasts until 997.

985
Death of Muirgus mac Domnaill, 35th King of Uí Maine.

986
Death of Mór ingen Donnchadha, Queen of Ireland

989
Sigtrygg Silkbeard becomes King of Dublin

990s
990
Castlekeeran raided by the Vikings. 
997
Brian Boru and Mael Seachnaill II divide Ireland between them

998
King Mael Mordha of Leinster, rebelled against the High King of Ireland, Brian Boru.

999
Brian Boru defeats the Leinstermen and the Vikings at the Battle of Glenn Mama. Sigtrygg Silkbeard, King of Dublin, submits to him. Brian plunders the city.
Death of Muirgheas mac Aedh, king of Uí Díarmata.

1000s
1000
Brian Boru led a combined Munster-Leinster-Dublin army in an attack on High King Máel Sechnaill II's home province of Meath.

Notes